Ratnikov  is a Slavic surname which notable bearers include:
Daniil Ratnikov (born 1988), Estonian football midfielder.
Eduard Ratnikov (born 1983), Estonian football midfielder.
Sergei Ratnikov (born 1959), Estonian retired football midfielder and current manager of Estonian  Esiliiga  team JK Tallinna Kalev.